Sammy Lee (born Samuel Lee, 1958 – 21 July 2012) was an expert on fertility and in vitro fertilisation

He was a hospital scientific consultant and was the chief scientist at the Wellington IVF programme. His book Counselling in Male Infertility was published in 1996; he contributed to major newspaper articles and appeared on several current affairs television programmes. He was the "inspiration" for Anthony Ling, the character in the novel One Life by Rebecca Frayn (Simon & Schuster 2006), after the author herself sought Lee's help for IVF treatment.

In 2010, Willing to Die for It, Lee's biography by Frances Lynn was published by Murray Print.

Lee died suddenly on 21 July 2012.

Current research
Lee's interests lay in the field of stem cell biology and regenerative medicine. He was a visiting professor at the University College London where he collaborated with various groups in the Anatomy Department examining the potential of bone marrow derived mesenchymal stem cells to give rise to neuronal/glial lineages in response to various growth factors and tissue culture manipulations. He also taught ethics of biomedicine at University College London.

In addition, he was interested in tissue engineering and teaching ethics in reproduction. He was attached to the Jessen-Mirsky laboratory and was studying remyelination. Lee had ethical committee approval in Brasil for creating artificial gametes from umbilical cord blood derived stem cells. It is hoped these will be used to overcome infertility.

Biography
Lee originally researched his Ph.D. at UCL under the supervision of Professor Ricardo Miledi FRS in the school of Sir Bernard Katz. Lee was also a signatory to a memento presented to Sir Bernard Katz on his 80th birthday from bona fide members of the school-occasion when the phrase "School of Katz" was coined.

Lee first published research in Neuroscience during the 1980s (from the Biophysics department at UCL), having worked on nerve muscle interaction ranging from examining TTX-resistant action potentials in denervated muscle  to studying cholinesterase activity in dissociated adult muscle fibres  following up on the work first done in the same department by Bill Betz and Bert Sakmann. Lee changed his focus to embryos, when he realised that many of the questions framed by his Neuroscience research were rooted in the matter of differentiation. The ultimate undifferentiated cell is the fertilised egg. This led Lee to work on gap junctions in early mammalian embryos (in the Anatomy & Embryology department at UCL), where work with Anne Warner FRS and Anne McLaren DBE FRS produced new information on factors affecting communication between cells and their developmental potential.

Lee became a clinical embryologist in 1985, when working with the gynaecologist Ian Craft he directed the IVF laboratory at the Wellington Hospital in London, then one of the largest units in the world. Consultancy work with the UK division of Ares Serono (1986–1994) also involved work with the Bourn Hallam Group, which Patrick Steptoe and Bob Edwards had set up after Louise Brown's birth. From 1995 to 2002 he was based at the Portland Hospital for Women & Children.

Lee latterly became based again at UCL. He was interested in tissue engineering and teaching ethics in reproduction. He was working on tissue engineering and stem cells mainly concerned with background research on Stem cells and Progenitor cells. Dr. Lee also had a keen interest in ethics and expressed this at UCL by running a course titled "Ethics of Fertility and Embryo Research". His students remarked him to be knowledgeable in the field of ethics and enthusiastic; they had particularly noted that he is clearly a fan of Kant.

He had previously served as an international editor of the Brazilian Journal of Assisted Reproduction. He served as a Trustee and director of several charities. His curriculum vitae lists numerous scientific publications. He was elected as a fellow of the Royal Society of Health (now Royal Society for Public Health) and the Royal Society of Medicine, both in 1987.

Lee's team at the Wellington pioneered the first UK practise of gamete Intra-fallopian Transfer (GIFT), The GIFT of Life (a technique invented by Ricardo Asch in the USA). The team was the second to carry out GIFT and then proceeded to post the largest series in the world in 1986.

Lee also helped perform some of the first egg donations in the UK, when directing the Wellington Hospital IVF Laboratory.

Lee pioneered a simple inexpensive efficient form of Mechanical Assisted Hatching in the UK. He produced the world's first intra-cytoplasmic sperm injection (ICSI with NASBA virus assay) virus free baby to an HIV discordant couple.

Lee had many media appearances having been on many TV shows as well as writing a number of newspapers articles . He wrote several books of his own: such as Counselling in Male Infertility, and was also a contributor/consultant in such books: The Miraculous World of The Unborn Baby (Quadrillion, Godalming, Surrey 1998) , Natural Fertility (Hamlyn 2002)  and Inconceivable Conceptions.

Lee was no stranger to controversy. In addition to his work in IVF, he had differences of opinion with the HFEA, most notably over the issue of human cloning. He states that if it may be done safely and effectively, and be morally justifiable.

Lee also wrote an article in the Sunday Times (10 November 2002) in the aftermath of a number of high-profile embryo transfer mixups in several human IVF clinics.

Professor Sammy Lee arranged a conference co-sponsored by the Progress Educational Trust entitled '21st Century Motherhood' at the University College London (UCL) (18 September 2009).
Speakers included Peter Brinsden, Consultant Medical Director at Bourn Hall Clinic, Professor Lord Robert Winston and Professor Shere Hite 
.

Education and experience
Lee was educated at Mill Hill School and received a B.Sc. in Physiology in 1979 from Chelsea College, (later merged into King's College London). He received a Ph.D. in Biophysics from University College London under the supervision of Prof. Ricardo Miledi, in a group associated with Sir Bernard Katz. He later received a Diploma in Counselling from London Hospital Medical College in 1991, and in 2004 a PGCE at the University of Greenwich.

Lee held the following appointments:
Research Associate in Biophysics (1982–1984), and Anatomy & Embryology (1984–1985) University College London
Laboratory Director, IVF unit at the Humana Hospital Wellington in London (1985–1986)
Consultant Clinical Embryologist, UK division of Ares Serono (human recombinant pharmaceutical company) 
Scientific Director of the Colchester Fertility Service (1992 to 2001)
Consultant Scientist and Director of intracytoplasmic sperm injection (ICSI) at the Portland Hospital for Women & Children (1995–2003)
Acting Scientific Director for the Chelsea & Westminster Hospital (1999–2000).
Honorary Senior Research Fellow in Reproductive Medicine at the Homerton Hospital (2000–2005)
Honorary Lecturer in the Anatomy & Developmental Biology Dept., University College London (2003–present).
Visiting Professor in Biomedical Science at the ABC Medical School in São Paulo, Brasil (2006–present).

References

Further reading
 http://www.ucl.ac.uk/news/news-articles/0702/07021906
 http://www.timesonline.co.uk/tol/news/article721865.ece Rebecca Frayn says Lee "created" Emmy, her daughter.
 http://www.rte.ie/news/2001/0816/primetime_av.html Lee debates cloning on RTÉ Primetime.
 Serono fertility award granted to Sammy Lee 1991

Bibliography

Selected journal articles

Newspaper articles

 S. Lee. The baby factories. Sunday Telegraph. 10 November 2002.

Books & book chapters/contributions

External links
 Official web page at UCL
 Mistakes in IVF
 CEO of infertility website

1958 births
2012 deaths
Academics of University College London
Alumni of King's College London
Alumni of the London Hospital Medical College
Alumni of the University of Greenwich
Alumni of University College London
English biophysicists
English physiologists
Fertility medicine
In vitro fertilisation
People educated at Mill Hill School
Scientists from London
Academic journal editors